Waiting for Caroline is a 1967 Canadian drama film directed by Ron Kelly and starring Alexandra Stewart, François Tassé, and William Needles. It was produced by the National Film Board of Canada and the Canadian Broadcasting Corporation, as their first-ever joint production.

The film was a Canadian Film Award nominee for Best Feature Film at the 20th Canadian Film Awards in 1968.

Premise
Caroline (Alexandra Stewart) is torn between two cultures, the English-speaking community of Vancouver where she grew up and the French-speaking Québec where she is currently living. Her uncertainty extends to her lovers, Peter (Robert Howay) from Vancouver who wants to take her home and Marc (François Tassé) from Québec who would like to continue their pleasant, if inconclusive affair.

Cast
Alexandra Stewart - Caroline
François Tassé - Marc
William Needles - Stephen
Aileen Seaton - Lally
Monique Mercure - Yvette
Paul Guèvremont - M. Simard
Daniel Gadouas - Jean-Pierre
Sharon Acker - Emily
Robert Howay - Peter
Lucie Poitras - Mme. Simard

Production
Waiting for Caroline was filmed with a budget of $516,000, after going $200,000 overbudget.

Reception
Senator Edgar Fournier opposed Waiting for Caroline and The Ernie Game for being indecent and both going overbudget.

References

Works cited

External links
Waiting for Caroline at the National Film Board of Canada

1967 films
Canadian independent films
English-language Canadian films
1967 drama films
Canadian drama films
National Film Board of Canada films
Films directed by Ron Kelly
Films scored by Eldon Rathburn
1960s English-language films
1960s Canadian films